Enrique Malek International Airport (Spanish: Aeropuerto Internacional Enrique Malek)  is an international airport serving David Sur, a city in the Chiriquí Province of Panama.

During heavy travel times, the airport registers 900 operations monthly, serving approximately 20,000 passengers from Mexico, the United States, Canada and Central America.

Facilities and expansion
The airport is on the south side of the city,  from downtown.

In early 2009, the Chiriqui regional director for the Authority of Civil Aeronautics (AAC), Inés de Esquivel, informed La Estrella: "...in the last five years, $1.5 million in investments have been made for the improvement of various areas at the Enrique Malek airport."

An estimated US$12 million improvement fund was passed by the Panamanian legislature that included runway expansion to allow for heavy aircraft. Additionally, the DAV perimeter fencing, first responders, hospitals, security, baggage claim, and terminal facilities were all included in the expansion.
The airport ramp and fueling facilities were expanded between 2008 and 2009. The extension of the runway from  began in 2010.

The former terminal was demolished and a new one built. When construction had finished, daily flights from Air Panama began. Also car rentals commenced operations in the new terminal. The international flight terminal receives numerous daily flights from Copa Airlines and Air Panama.

History
Known as David Field or San Jose Field during World War II, the airport was an auxiliary of Howard Field, which is near Panama City. It accommodated a variety of United States Army Air Forces personnel, dedicated for the most part in training and reconnaissance missions over the Southeast Pacific coastline, from Honduras in the north, to Peru in the south as part of the defense of the Panama Canal. Enrique Malek International Airport was first built in 1941 as part of an agreement between the U.S and Panama. Wartime units assigned to the airfield were:
 397th Bombardment Squadron (6th Bombardment Group), 11 December 194118 August 1942 (B-18 Bolo, B-17 Flying Fortress)
 45th Bombardment Squadron (40th Bombardment Group), 13 November 194218 February 1943 (LB-30 (B-24A) Liberator)
 3d Bombardment Squadron (VI Bomber Command), 12 March1 April 1943; 11 June 19436 April 1944; 8 December 1944 – 28 October 1945 (B-17 Flying Fortress)

Airlines and destinations

See also
Transport in Panama
List of airports in Panama

References

External links
OurAirports - Enrique Malek International Airport

Airfields of the United States Army Air Forces in Panama
Airports in Panama
Buildings and structures in Chiriquí Province
Airports established in 1941